NewYork-Presbyterian/Columbia University Irving Medical Center (NYP/CUIMC), also known as the Columbia University Irving Medical Center (CUIMC), is an academic medical center and the largest campus of NewYork-Presbyterian Hospital. It includes Columbia University Vagelos College of Physicians and Surgeons, College of Dental Medicine, School of Nursing and Mailman School of Public Health, as well as the Morgan Stanley Children's Hospital, the New York State Psychiatric Institute, the Audubon Biomedical Research Park, and other institutions.

The campus covers several blocks—primarily between West 165th and 169th Streets from Riverside Drive to Audubon Avenue—in the Washington Heights neighborhood of Manhattan, New York City.

History 
CUIMC was built in the 1920s on the site of Hilltop Park, the one-time home stadium of the New York Yankees. The land was donated by Edward Harkness, who also donated most of the financing for the original buildings.  Built specifically to house a medical school and Presbyterian Hospital, it was the first academic medical center in the world. Formerly known as the Columbia-Presbyterian Medical Center (CPMC), the name change followed the 1997 formation of NewYork-Presbyterian Hospital, a merger of two medical centers each affiliated with an Ivy League university: Columbia-Presbyterian with Columbia University, and New York Hospital-Cornell Medical Center, with Cornell University's Weill Cornell Medical College.

The Medical and Graduate Education Building was designed by architects Diller Scofidio + Renfro and Gensler and the structural engineer was Leslie E. Robertson Associates.

In September 2016, the campus was renamed for one of the hospital and the university's largest benefactors, Herbert and Florence Irving. Herbert Irving was a co-founder and former vice-chairman of Sysco.

The hospital completed the first successful heart transplant in a child, the first use of the anti-seizure medication, dilantin, to treat epilepsy, and the isolation of the first known odour receptors in the nose.

It supported discoveries related to how memory is stored in the brain, and Nobel Prize-winning developments in cardiac catheterization (1956) and cryo-electron microscopy (2017).

Gallery

References
Notes

External links

Columbia Presbyterian Hospital Key Events worth remembering

Columbia University
NewYork–Presbyterian Healthcare System
Hospitals in Manhattan
American medical research
Teaching hospitals in New York City
Washington Heights, Manhattan
Columbia University research institutes
Medical research institutes in New York (state)